Alex Forrest may refer to:

Alex Forrest (fencer) (1881–1964), British fencer
Alex Forrest (footballer) (born 1908), Scottish footballer
Alex Forrest (curler) (born 1989), Manitoba curler
Alexander Forrest (1849–1901), Australian explorer and politician
Alex Forrest, antagonist in Fatal Attraction